Julia Sutton may refer to:

 Julia Sutton (actress)
 Julia Sutton (dance historian)